Loukman Ali (born 1 June 1990) is a Ugandan cinematographer, screenwriter, film director, producer and Graphic Designer. His directorial debut was Monday  followed up by The Bad Mexican, released in 2017.The film was nominated in various festival including the Amakula International film festival. His other major films include The Girl in a Yellow Jumper, The Blind Date and Sixteen Rounds. He is known to frequently working with actor Michael Wawuyo Jr. and filmmaker Usama Mukwaya.

Early life and background
After working as a graphics designer in Norway, Loukman returned to Uganda and ventured into advertising until he began doing films in 2014.

Film breakthrough

(2014–2020): The Girl in the Yellow Jumper
This is Loukman Ali's feature film debut. The film was initially to premiere on April 15, 2020, but was subsequently postponed due to COVID-19. The Film will however have its world premiere at the Urbanworld Film Festival during its 25 anniversary

2021 – present: The Blind Date, Sixteen Rounds
In collaboration with filmmaker Usama Mukwaya, The Blind Date is the first of the three episodes meant to make an anthology of sorts. The short film features Martha Kay alongside Michael Wawuyo Jr. with Raymond Rushabiro who stars as former army man – Jacob alongside Riverdan Rugaaju, Patriq Nkakalukanyi and Allen Musumba. A follow up episode titled Sixteen Rounds premiered on September 16, 2021. The 37 minutes short features Michael Wawuyo Jr. again and Natasha Sinayobye in leading roles.
Loukman announced in October that a feature-length film titled Ddamba based on the Sixteen Round's story is in the making.

Filmography

Film

Awards and nominations

Won
 2021: Best Short Film, Uganda Film Festival

Nominated
 2021: Best Short Film, 42 Durban International Film Festival

References

External links
 

Ugandan screenwriters
Ugandan film directors
Living people
1990 births